Berniece B. "Bunny" Heffner (1897 or 1898 – May 24, 1989) was an American labor unionist.

Born in Tiffin, Ohio, Heffner studied at Heidelberg College before in 1919 moving to Fort Sill, Oklahoma, to work as a typist.  In 1935, she was appointed as the first secretary-treasurer of the American Federation of Government Employees, moving to Washington DC.  In the role, she served on numerous government commissions and labor boards.  She also served as acting president of the union on three occasions, when incumbents resigned or died.

In 1953, Heffner moved to become Director of Personnel for the International Brotherhood of Teamsters.  She served in the post until her retirement, in 1974.

References

Year of birth missing
1989 deaths
American trade unionists
International Brotherhood of Teamsters people
People from Tiffin, Ohio